Rome Adler dela Rosa (born December 11, 1990) is a Filipino professional basketball player for the Magnolia Hotshots of the Philippine Basketball Association (PBA).

Early life

Dela Rosa grew up in San Diego, California and his favorite sport was originally baseball, where he played as third-baseman and at times catcher. But after years of regularly watching his father play, basketball eventually became his sport of choice.

College and amateur career
Dela Rosa played collegiate basketball at San Beda College, where he was a vital cog to four straight NCAA titles for the Red Lions. While in the amateur ranks, he also suited up for the PC Gilmore Wizards and the NLEX Road Warriors in the PBA D-League.

Professional career

Alaska Aces (2014–2016)
After he played out his college eligibility in 2013, Dela Rosa was drafted in the second round, 13th overall by the Alaska Aces in the 2014 PBA draft. He spent the first two conferences mostly on the bench, acting as a third-stringer to skipper Tony dela Cruz and Calvin Abueva.  In the third conference, he was thrust into the starting lineup due to injuries to some players. He started in all 9 games in the Governors’ Cup while seeing a big increase in his minutes (17.7/game). He also doubled his rebounding average to 2.5 RPG and almost tripled his scoring to 4.5 PPG, from less than 1.4 PPG in the first two conferences.  On July 5, 2015, in Alaska’s series-clinching 82–77 win over the Star Hotshots, he played the best game of his young career, as he scored 11 points on 4-for-5 shooting in 31:45 minutes of action.

Star Hotshots (2016–present)
On December 9, 2016, Dela Rosa traded by the Alaska Aces to the Star Hotshots in exchange for Jake Pascual.

PBA career statistics

As of the end of 2021 season

Season-by-season averages
 
|-
| align=left | 
| align=left | Alaska
| 41 || 12.0 || .526 || .250 || .667 || 1.6 || .5 || .4 || .0 || 2.9
|-
| align=left | 
| align=left | Alaska
| 49 || 10.2 || .452 || .353 || .750 || 1.4 || .6 || .3 || .0 || 2.5
|-
| align=left | 
| align=left | Star
| 38 || 11.6 || .414 || .217 || .583 || 1.3 || .3 || .3 || – || 2.9
|-
| align=left | 
| align=left | Magnolia
| 57 || 25.6 || .495 || .426 || .720 || 3.4 || 1.0 || .7 || .1 || 7.4
|-
| align=left | 
| align=left | Magnolia
| 53 || 23.8 || .468 || .346 || .750 || 3.0 || 1.1 || .7 || .1 || 6.2
|-
| align=left | 
| align=left | Magnolia
| 11 || 22.2 || .471 || .414 || .909 || 2.6 || 1.0 || .8 || .1 || 8.0
|-
| align=left | 
| align=left | Magnolia
| 35 || 25.6 || .451 || .423 || .763 || 3.3 || .8 || .7 || – || 6.2
|-class=sortbottom
| align=center colspan=2 | Career
| 284 || 18.6 || .471 || .382 || .726 || 2.4 || .8 || .5 || .0 || 5.0

Personal life
Dela Rosa is the son of former PBA player Romy dela Rosa, who played in ten seasons with Shell, Sta. Lucia, and the Negros Slashers in the defunct MBA, and the nephew of Ruben dela Rosa, also a PBA and MBA player, who was a teammate of current Alaska coach Alex Compton during his time with the Manila Metrostars.

References

1990 births
Living people
Alaska Aces (PBA) players
Basketball players from San Diego
Filipino men's basketball players
Magnolia Hotshots players
San Beda Red Lions basketball players
Shooting guards
Small forwards
Filipino people of American descent
Alaska Aces (PBA) draft picks